Eva Sakálová (born 9 May 1985) is a Slovak stage and television actress. As well as parts in television series and films, she has performed in productions at the Slovak National Theater.

Selected filmography 
7 dní hříchů (2012)
Panelák (television, 2012)

References

External links

1985 births
Living people
Slovak film actresses
Slovak stage actresses
Slovak television actresses
Actors from Bratislava